The Archbishop of Cashel was an archiepiscopal title which took its name after the town of Cashel, County Tipperary in Ireland. Following the Reformation, there had been parallel apostolic successions to the title: one in the Church of Ireland and the other in the Roman Catholic Church. The archbishop of each denomination also held the title of Bishop of Emly. The Church of Ireland title was downgraded to a bishopric in 1838, and in the Roman Catholic Church, it was superseded by the role of Archbishop of Cashel and Emly when the two dioceses were united in 2015.

History

Pre-Reformation 

In 1118, the metropolitan archbishoprics of Armagh and Cashel were established at the Synod of Ráth Breasail. The archbishop of Cashel had metropolitan jurisdiction over the southern half of Ireland, known as Leth Moga. At the Synod of Kells in 1152, the metropolitan see of Cashel lost territory on the creation of the metropolitan archbishoprics of Dublin and Tuam. The pre-Reformation archbishops' episcopal seat was located at the Rock of Cashel, the traditional royal seat of the kings of Munster.

Following the Reformation, two parallel episcopal successions ensued: one of the Church of Ireland and the other of the Roman Catholic Church.

Church of Ireland 

In the Church of Ireland, the bishopric of Emly was united to the archbishopric of Cashel by an act of the Parliament of Ireland in 1568. Under the Church Temporalities (Ireland) Act 1833, the bishopric of Waterford and Lismore was united to the archbishopric of Cashel and Emly on 14 August 1833. On the death of Archbishop Laurence in 1838, the archepiscopal see lost its metropolitan status and became the bishopric of Cashel and Waterford in the Church of Ireland Province of Dublin. Through reorganisation in the Church of Ireland in 1976, the bishopric of Emly was transferred to the bishopric of Limerick and Killaloe; the remainder was united with other sees to become the bishopric of Cashel and Ossory.

Roman Catholic Church 

In the Roman Catholic Church, the archepiscopal see of Cashel had an unsettled history between the 1560s and the late 17th century. While some archbishops were appointed, there were periods when the see was vacant or administered by vicars apostolic. From the 18th century onwards, a relaxation in the Penal Laws permitted a consistent succession of archbishops. Since 10 May 1718, the archbishops of Cashel have also been bishops of Emly when the two titles were united.

On 22 November 2014, Pope Francis accepted the resignation of the Most Reverend Dermot Clifford from the pastoral government of the Metropolitan Archdiocese of Cashel and Emly, in accordance with 1983 Code of Canon Law on age grounds. On the same day, the Most Reverend Kieran O'Reilly, Bishop of Killaloe, was appointed to be the next Metropolitan Archbishop of Cashel and apostolic administrator of Emly. On 26 January 2015, the sees of Cashel and Emly were united to form the new metropolitan see of Cashel and Emly, and O'Reilly was appointed its first metropolitan archbishop.

Pre-Reformation archbishops

Post-Reformation archbishops

Church of Ireland succession

Roman Catholic succession

References

Bibliography

  
 
 

 
 
Bishops of Cashel and Ossory
 
Cashel, County Tipperary
Diocese of Cashel and Ossory
Cashel
Roman Catholic Archdiocese of Cashel and Emly